Daniel Adams Eaton (born April 15, 1956) is an American politician in the state of New Hampshire. He is a member of the New Hampshire House of Representatives, sitting as a Democrat from the Cheshire 3 district, having been first elected in 2012. He previously served from 1976 to 1990 and 2002 to 2010.

References

Living people
People from Keene, New Hampshire
People from Stoddard, New Hampshire
1956 births
Democratic Party members of the New Hampshire House of Representatives
20th-century American politicians
21st-century American politicians